Music to Listen to Barney Kessel By is an album by guitarist Barney Kessel recorded at sessions in 1956 and released on the Contemporary label.

Reception

The Allmusic review by Rovi Staff states: "Featured is Kessel's guitar with five woodwinds and a rhythm section".

Track listing
 "Cheerful Little Earful" (Harry Warren, Ira Gershwin, Billy Rose) - 3:24
 "Makin' Whoopee" (Walter Donaldson, Gus Kahn) - 3:18
 "My Reverie" (Claude Debussy, Larry Clinton) - 2:30
 "Blues for a Playboy" (Barney Kessel) - 3:58
 "Love Is for the Very Young" (David Raksin) - 2:27
 "Carioca" (Vincent Youmans, Edward Eliscu, Gus Kahn) - 4:30
 "Mountain Greenery" (Richard Rodgers, Lorenz Hart) - 3:46
 "Indian Summer" (Victor Herbert, Al Dubin) - 4:58
 "Gone with the Wind" (Allie Wrubel, Herb Magidson) - 2:45
 "Laura" (Raskin, Johnny Mercer) - 3:23
 "I Love You" (Cole Porter) - 3:27
 "Fascinating Rhythm" (George Gershwin, Ira Gershwin) - 2:27 
Recorded at Contemporary's studio in Los Angeles on August 6, 1956 (tracks 2, 9, 11 & 12), October 15, 1956 (tracks 1, 3, 4 & 6) and December 4, 1956 (tracks 5, 7, 8 & 10).

Personnel
Barney Kessel - guitar
Buddy Collette - flute, alto flute, clarinet (tracks 2, 9, 11 & 12)
Junie Cobb - oboe, English horn 
George W. Smith - clarinet
Justin Gordon - clarinet, bass clarinet
Howard Terry - clarinet, bass clarinet, bassoon
André Previn (tracks 2, 9, 11 & 12), Jimmy Rowles (tracks 1, 3-6, 8 & 10), Claude Williamson (track 7) - piano
Buddy Clark - bass
Shelly Manne - drums

References

Contemporary Records albums
Barney Kessel albums
1957 albums